Route 159 is a  state highway connecting the Hartford and Springfield areas in the U.S. states of Connecticut and Massachusetts. It begins as the northern extension of Main Street in Hartford and proceeds northward along the west bank of the Connecticut River towards Agawam, Massachusetts. The route ends at the junction of Route 147 and Route 75 in Agawam center just south of the West Springfield city line. The route was originally designated as U.S. Route 5A in 1932 and was renumbered to its modern designation in October 1968.

Route description

Route 159 officially begins at the Hartford-Windsor town line as Windsor Avenue, near an interchange with I-91.  In Windsor, it underpasses I-291, with access to and from the east provided by Deerfield Road. Almost immediately, it meets the eastern end of Route 218.  After passing the east end of Route 178, Route 159 enters the center of Windsor, passing the town green before intersecting the southern end of Route 75.  It then crosses the Farmington River, and starts to parallel the west bank of the Connecticut River, which it will for most of the rest of its length.  In Windsor Locks, it meets I-91 once again at Exit 42, and has a brief overlap with Route 140.  It passes along the eastern side of Suffield, where it has a brief overlap with Route 190.  It then crosses the Massachusetts state line into Agawam, where it passes by Six Flags New England before entering the center of town.  North of the center, Route 159 signage ends at an interchange with Route 57, but the official route continues north along Main Street to the intersection of Route 75 and Route 147 just south of the Westfield River and the West Springfield city line.

Route 159 in Windsor is also known as the Kasmir Pulaski Memorial Highway.

History

Modern Route 159 roughly follows the path of the Upper Boston Post Road between Hartford and Springfield. In the 1920s, current Route 159 in Connecticut, with a few minor exceptions, was a primary state road designated as State Highway 110. Around 1930, the continuation in Massachusetts was numbered as State Route 5A, which ran along Main Street but continued north along River Road to the South End Bridge, where it crossed into Springfield to connect with U.S. Route 5. In the 1932 state highway renumbering, the route in both Connecticut and Massachusetts was designated as U.S. Route 5A. However, by 1938, Massachusetts redesignated its portion of the route as State Route 5A, truncating US 5A to the state line. The new State Route 5A was also relocated to follow Main Street into West Springfield, then continuing along River Street, Park Street, and Elm Street, where it ended at US 5. In October 1968, Connecticut decommissioned its U.S. Route 5A and the road was redesignated in both states as Route 159.The portion in West Springfield, which was not state-maintained, became an unnumbered road.

Junction list
Mileposts reset at the state line.

References

External links

159
Transportation in Hartford County, Connecticut
159
Transportation in Hampden County, Massachusetts
U.S. Route 5
Windsor, Connecticut
Windsor Locks, Connecticut
Suffield, Connecticut
Agawam, Massachusetts